UZ, Uz, or uz may refer to:

People
 Johann Uz (1720-1796), German anacreontic poet
 Uz, son of Aram, one of the sons of Aram, according to the Hebrew Bible (Genesis 10:23)

Places
 Land of Uz, homeland of Job, according to the biblical Book of Job (Job 1:1)
 Uz, Hautes-Pyrénées, France
 Uz, Iran
 Uz, Kentucky, US
 Uz (river), a river and a valley in Romania
 Uyts, Armenia, also called Uz
 Uzbekistan, ISO country code
 .uz, reserved top-level domain for Uzbekistan

Schools
 Universidad de Zamboanga, in Zamboanga City, Philippines
 University of Zaragoza, a public university in Aragón, Spain
 University of Zimbabwe in Harare, the oldest and largest university in Zimbabwe

Other uses 
 Uz or Oghuz Turks, a group of loosely linked nomadic Turkic peoples
 Ukrzaliznytsia, the national railway company of Ukraine
 Uzbek language (ISO 639-1 code "uz")
 Buraq Air (IATA code UZ), a Libyan airline
Ústredňa Židov, a Judenrat in Slovakia during the Holocaust
Toyota UZ engine

See also
 Uzès, a commune of the Gard  in southern France
 Uzi, a family of Israeli submachine guns